Boneau/Bryan-Brown, Inc. is a public relations company based in Manhattan, New York, United States, largely supporting Broadway theatre productions as a theatrical press agency.

The company was formed by the partnership of Chris Boneau and Adrian Bryan-Brown in 1991. Broadway productions supported include, among hundreds, the musical Guys and Dolls in 1992. The company initially represented the rock musical Spider-Man: Turn Off the Dark which finally opened on Broadway in 2011.

References

External links 
 Boneau/Bryan-Brown website

Marketing companies established in 1991
Companies based in New York City
Public relations companies of the United States
Broadway press agents
1991 establishments in New York City